Du Jin (Tu Chin, traditional: 杜堇, simplified: 杜堇); (ca. 1465–1509) was a Chinese painter of landscapes, human figures, flowers, and animals during the Ming Dynasty (1368–1644). Du's specific birth and death years are unknown.

Du was born in Zhenjiang in the Jiangsu province. His style name was 'Junan' and his sobriquets were 'Chengju, Gukuang, Qingxia tingzhang'. Du later moved to Beijing where he produced many of his works.

The adjoining four-part silk painting is on the traditional subject of the Four Arts of the Chinese Scholar and is called "18 Scholars"; it is in the Shanghai Museum.

References

Painters from Zhenjiang
Year of death unknown
Ming dynasty landscape painters
Year of birth unknown